Operation Jacana is the codename for a series of operations carried out by coalition forces in Afghanistan. The operations were carried out most notably by 45 Commando Royal Marines. U.S. forces, Australian SAS and Norwegian FSK also participated. The operation was a follow-up operation of Operation Anaconda and was meant to kill or capture the remaining Al-Qaida and Taliban rebels.  The operation has been called a "mopping up" operation after Operation Anaconda.  The operation is named after an African bird type, jacana, described in one manual as "shy, retiring, easily overlooked".

Operation Jacana includes the following operations:
 Operation Ptarmigan
 Operation Snipe
 Operation Condor
 Operation Buzzard

All these operations were meant to "clean up" the remaining Al-Qaida and Taliban forces out of the area of operations.

Events

Operation Ptarmigan
On 16 April 2002, a Royal Marine taskforce had been deployed to Bagram Airbase as part of Operation Ptarmigan: A 5-day operation with the aim to clear high mountain valleys (up to 11,000 ft), south east of Gardez, searching for Taliban and Al-Qaeda forces and to destroy their bunkers and cave complexes. The Operation took place in coordination with Coalition forces conducting Operation Mountain Lion (whose objectives were the same) that began a day earlier. 400 troops from the Royal Marines reconnaissance troop supported by the RAF, discovered a number of previously unknown cave complexes, one of which contained over 20,000 rounds of anti-aircraft ammunition in the Shah-i-Kot area, which was destroyed.

More than 400 Royal Marines went into "action" alongside a small number of US and Afghan troops, after the US requested help; they did not encounter either Taliban or al-Qaeda forces—supporting suspicions that many have fled across the nearby border to Pakistan—but there was evidence and indications that the facilities had been used and a coalition troops seized a "great deal" of papers, maps and radios in Shah-i-Kot area which was studied for intelligence information.

The operation ended on April 18 2002. By 20 April 2002, a total of nearly 1,700 Royal Marines had been deployed as part of the task force.

Operation Snipe

In May 2002, 600 Royal Marines and 400 Afghan soldiers supported by U.S. air power and U.S. special operations troops began Operation Snipe, a continuation of Operation Ptarmigan in Patika Province. The Royal Marine force carrying out the operation did not come across any al Qaeda or Taliban fighters (whilst moving into position the marines found a small-arms ammunition hidden in a cave and some old defensive positions belonging to al-Qaeda), however on 9 May, the troops discovered caves and removed 30 truckloads of  anti-aircraft, anti-tank ammunition and other heavy munitions and military equipment, including mortars, 2 Russian-made tanks were also found outside the cave. On 10 May, British troops destroyed "a vast arsenal of weaponry" (more than 20 truckloads of ammunition and weapons were destroyed in the biggest controlled explosion British forces have carried out since World War II) and al Qaeda or Taliban infrastructure by blowing up an enormous cache of weapons stored in a cave complex. The operation lasted 2 weeks (other sources say 16 days) and ended on 13 May 2002, the operation was part of a much larger operation led by the 101st Airborne Division and designed to show the al-Qa'eda and Taliban fighters, the vast majority of whom were known to be in sanctuaries inside Pakistan, that they could not operate inside Afghanistan with impunity. One reason for the failure of not finding any al-Qaeda or Taliban militants was the refusal by Major-General Franklin Hagenbeck, the US force commander, of several British requests for a blocking force of American troops from 101st Airborne Division to plug two valleys as the Marines moved through them.

Operation Condor
On 17 May 2002, coalition forces began Operation Condor following after an incident in Patika province the previous day: On May 16, an Australian SAS patrol and came under fire for five hours from heavy mortars and machine guns and were chased by 20 or 60 suspected al-Qaeda and Taliban militants, Apache helicopter gunships and AC-130 gunship carried out airstrikes killing about 10 people, the rest of fighters are thought to have dispersed into small groups and blended in with local residents or fled across the border to neighbouring Pakistan; the next day, and other coalition forces had been deployed to assist them where a 1,000-strong coalition force (500-800 were Royal Marines) led by the Royal Marines surrounded the Khost-Paktia region, American, British and Australian forces were in "blocking" positions as the British Royal Marines swept the area, supported by US attack helicopters and gunships who bombarded the area; the operation was conducted at heights of between 6,000 and 8,000 feet. On 17 May Brigadier Roger Lane, the top British commander in the coalition forces were battling a "substantial force" of suspected al Qaeda and Taliban fighters in the mountains, but British Royal Marines spokesman Lieutenant-Colonel Ben Curry said on 18 May: "There has been no combat, we have established a forward operating base and are now clearing the area," Coalition jets and helicopters supported ground troops throughout the day. Coalition troops searched the area without meeting any resistance, but a small amount of ammunition including two 120 mm rockets On 20 May, Brigadier Roger Lane, the commander of the Royal Marine force in Afghanistan was replaced by Brigadier Jim Dutton, relations between Lane and the head of the US military were said to be poor after US General Tommy Franks allegedly found out about the Royal Marines' Operation from CNN rather than from Brig Lane. He also contradicted the US defence secretary, Donald Rumsfeld, by saying the war in Afghanistan would be over in a few weeks. Mr Rumsfeld publicly disagreed; he lost the confidence of his men, his junior commanders and his tactical decisions look increasingly "desperate for some success".

Operation Buzzard
On 28 or 29 May 2002, the Royal Marines began Operation Buzzard: the aim of the operation was to "prevent freedom of movement of al-Qa'eda and Taliban and to deny them sanctuary from which to operate" according to Royal Marine Lieutenant-Colonel Ben Curry. 45 to 300 British Marines from Taskforce Jacana and local Afghan soldiers were deployed into Khost close to Afghan-Pakistan border, accompanied by several US civil affairs officials on a "hearts and minds" operation; amid fears that al-Qaeda and Taliban forces were plotting terrorist attacks from across the frontier. The Marines conducted patrols in populated and rural areas using a mixture of helicopter, foot and vehicle patrols and setting up checkpoints; this new method was to be "unpredictable, operating in smaller sub-unit attachments operating in an area sometimes covertly and introducing that unpredictability and doubt into the minds of the al-Qaeda and Taliban."

Caves and bunkers containing arms, ammunition and supplies were found and destroyed. Over 100 mortars, a hundred anti-tank weapons along with hundreds of RPGs, anti-personnel mines, rockets and artillery shells and thousands of rounds of small-arms and anti-aircraft ammunition. Two British marines confronted nine armed insurgents and made them surrender.

The operation came to an end on 9 July 2002, the operation had shown that al-Qaeda and the Taliban had abandoned a large scale presence in the region.

45 Commando had been chosen for this operation due to their expertise in high-altitude warfare, for which they train regularly in the Norwegian mountains; despite this experience, altitude sickness still became a problem with some of the marines, who needed to be airlifted out due to this condition. Norwegian special forces were also specifically asked by NATO to operate in these highland areas because of their experience in high altitudes and cold weather.

Sources
 Special Forces: War Against Terrorism by Eric Micheletti.

References

Military operations of the War in Afghanistan (2001–2021)
Military operations of the War in Afghanistan (2001–2021) involving the United Kingdom
Military operations of the War in Afghanistan (2001–2021) involving the United States
Military operations of the War in Afghanistan (2001–2021) involving Australia
Military operations of the War in Afghanistan (2001–2021) involving Norway